Colin McLean (born c. 1953) is a Scottish fund manager who was the co-founder with his wife Margaret Lawson, and Donald Robertson, of Scottish Value Management.

References

Living people
Businesspeople from Glasgow
Scottish chief executives
1950s births
Year of birth uncertain